1988 Masters may refer to:
1988 Masters Tournament, golf
1988 Masters (snooker)
1988 Nabisco Masters, tennis